United Nations Security Council resolution 522, adopted unanimously on 4 October 1982, after recalling Resolution 479 (1980) and Resolution 514 (1982), the council called for an immediate ceasefire between Iran and Iraq, calling for the withdrawal of both sides to their internationally recognised borders.

The Council recognised that Iraq had agreed to implement Resolution 514, and urged Iran to do the same, which was pressing its advantage. The resolution also weakened Iran's right of self-defense.

The resolution went on to affirm the necessity of implementing United Nations observers to the region to monitor the ceasefire and withdrawal, calling on all other Member States to refrain from actions that would prolong the conflict. Finally, Resolution 522 requested the Secretary-General Javier Pérez de Cuéllar to report back to the council on attempts to implement the resolution within seventy-two hours.

See also
 Iran–Iraq relations
 Iran–Iraq War
 List of United Nations Security Council Resolutions 501 to 600 (1982–1987)
 Resolutions 479, 514, 540, 552, 582, 588, 598, 612, 616, 619 and 620

References

External links
 
Text of the Resolution at undocs.org

 0522
 0522
1982 in Iran
1982 in Iraq
October 1982 events